London & Regional Properties (L&R) is a private real estate and leisure investment firm based in London, United Kingdom. It is one of the largest privately held principal investors in Europe, performing private equity style investments in direct property and asset-backed operating businesses.

L&R was founded in 1987 by billionaire brothers Richard Livingstone, a chartered surveyor, and Ian, a former optometrist, who are described by the Irish Independent as "secretive". The firm's AuM is in the upwards of £9 billion. L&R has business interests in the United Kingdom, Europe, and the Americas

Portfolio
The company's portfolio includes:

Investments
 Atlas Hotels, a hotel real estate and operating company with 46 limited service hotels across the UK
 David Lloyd Leisure, a gym and health club company with 85 locations across the UK and Europe
 London Hilton on Park Lane
 The Trafalgar St. James London
 The Lensbury
 The Empire, Leicester Square
 General Healthcare Group, the UK's leading independent health provider with 67 hospitals
 Atu's real estate portfolio of 271 assets located in Germany
 Diageo's head office in London WC1
 55 Baker Street, site of Marks & Spencer's former head office
90 care homes, formerly managed by Southern Cross until 2011, to be managed by Orchard Care Homes in the North and Minster in the South-East 
 Cliveden, purchased from the collapsed Von Essen Hotels group in February 2012. The Livingstones withdrew from parallel negotiations to buy the Royal Crescent hotel.
 Crowne Plaza hotel in Cambridge was bought for more than €45m from the former Sean Quinn Group in August 2012.
A development of 750 apartments with hotel and leisure facilities at Greenwich Peninsula
The Panama Pacifico, a US$700 million mini-city on the banks of the Panama Canal

References

External links
http://www.lrp.co.uk/ - official website

Property companies based in London
Real estate companies established in 1987
Family-owned companies of the United Kingdom